Vĩnh Yên is the city capital of Vĩnh Phúc Province, in the Red River Delta region of northern Vietnam. The population is 76,650 people, the area is 50.87 km².

This city hosted 2012 Asian Men's Cup Volleyball Championship.

Climate

References

Populated places in Vĩnh Phúc province
Provincial capitals in Vietnam
Districts of Vĩnh Phúc province
Cities in Vietnam